Kimball Jamison is a duo album from the American rock singers Jimi Jamison (Survivor) and Bobby Kimball (Toto), released on October 14, 2011 by Frontiers Records.

The album was produced by German bassist, singer and music producer Mat Sinner from Primal Fear. Alexander Beyrodt was the guitarist for the album. Jamison and Kimball finished the lead vocal recordings in Los Angeles while the instrumental part was recorded in Germany. The songs on the album were written by several songwriters, including:

 Richard Page (Mr Mister)
 Randy Goodrum (Toto, Steve Perry)
 Robert Sall (Work of Art)
 John Waite
 Jim Peterik

among others.

Track listing

Personnel 

 Bobby Kimball - lead vocals, backing vocals
 Jimi Jamison - lead vocals, backing vocals
 Alex Beyrodt - guitars, lead guitar 
 Mat Sinner - bass
 Jimmy Kresic - keyboards
 Martin Schmidt - drums and percussion.

Facts 

Jimi Jamison and Bobby Kimball were long-time friends by the release of the album. The album has been described by AllMusic as "meshing their two great voices in a traditional Melodic Rock sound that each portrayed so famously with their perspective bands, Toto and Survivor."

The song "Chasing Euphoria" was written by 17 different songwriters collaborating.

The bonus DVD shows the making of the album.

References

2011 albums
Jimi Jamison albums
Bobby Kimball albums